The Cory Pass Loop is a trail located in Banff National Park. The Pass is located outside the city of Banff, Alberta, between Mount Edith and Mount Cory. The pass opens up to Gargoyle Valley; the trail continues around the east side of Mount Edith returning to the original trail head. The total elevation gain is 915 m (3,000 ft), and the total distance is 13 km (8.1 mi).

External links 
 Official Parks Canada Hiking Trails in the town of Banff
 Hikes and Scrambles in the Canadian Rockies
 Hiking Trails and Photographs of the Canadian Rockies

Banff National Park
Geography of Alberta
Hiking trails in Alberta